Robert Christensen (born 31 October 1959) is an Australian cricketer. He played four first-class matches for South Australia between 1982 and 1984.

See also
 List of South Australian representative cricketers

References

External links
 

1959 births
Living people
Australian cricketers
South Australia cricketers
Cricketers from Adelaide